Baqer Tangeh (also Romanized as Bāqer Tangeh) is a village in Saheli Rural District, in the Central District of Babolsar County, Mazandaran Province, Iran. At the 2006 census, its population was 4,374, in 1,198 families.

References 

Populated places in Babolsar County